Bustantigo is a parish (administrative division) in Allande municipality located within the province and autonomous community of Asturias, in northern Spain.

The population is 19 (INE 2011). The postal code is 33888.

Villages and hamlets
 La Folgueriza ("La Folgueiriza")
 El Plantao ("El Plantáu")
 Bustantigo ("Bustantigu")

References

External links
 Allande 

Parishes in Allande